The short straight punch is an offensive hand technique used in some fighting sports.

Sources
 Georges Blanchet, Boxe et sports de combat en éducation physique, Ed. Chiron, Paris, 1947
Alain Delmas, 1. Lexique de la boxe et des autres boxes (Document fédéral de formation d’entraîneur), Aix-en-Provence, 1981-2005 – 2. Lexique de combatique (Document fédéral de formation d’entraîneur), Toulouse, 1975–1980.
Jack Dempsey, Championship fighting, Ed. Jack Cuddy, 1950
Gabrielle & Roland Habersetzer, Encyclopédie des arts martiaux de l'Extrême-Orient, Ed. Amphora, Paris, 2000
Louis Lerda, J.C. Casteyre, Sachons boxer, Ed. Vigot, Paris, 1944

Punches (combat)
Boxing terminology
Kickboxing terminology